Ain Beida is a small town and rural commune in Ouezzane Province of the Tanger-Tetouan-Al Hoceima region of Morocco. At the time of the 2004 census, the commune had a total population of 11,851 people living in 2193 households.

References

Populated places in Ouezzane Province
Rural communes of Tanger-Tetouan-Al Hoceima